The 2012–13 Segona Divisió was the 14th season of second-tier football in Andorra.

Regular stage

League table

Results

Relegation play-offs
The seventh-placed club in the Primera Divisió competed in a two-legged relegation playoff against the runners-up of the Segona Divisió, for one spot in 2013–14 Primera Divisió.

External links
 

Segona Divisió seasons
Andorra
2012–13 in Andorran football